Butt may refer to:
 Figurative or literal blunt ends:
 Butt joint, a woodworking joinery technique
 Butt splice connector, a type of crimp electrical connector
 Buttstock or butt, the back  part of a rifle or other firearm
 Headbutt or butt, (implicitly blunt) blow administered with the head
 Buttocks
 Cigarette butt
 Boston butt or pork butt, a shoulder cut of pork
 Metonym for cigarette
 Measurement and storage of liquids:
 Butt (unit), a measure of volume
 Butt, an English wine cask size
 "Water Butt" a rainwater tank
Archery butt, practice target 
 Surnames:
 Butt (surname)
 Bhat, a surname in India and Pakistan, also spelled as Butt
 Titled works:
 Butt (magazine)
 The Butt, a 2008 novel by Will Self
Der Butt, German title of The Flounder (1977), Günter Grass novel
 "Butt Butt", a song by Monrose from Temptation

See also
 BUT (disambiguation)
 Butte (disambiguation)
 Butts (disambiguation)